Bittersweet Hill is a mountain located in the Catskill Mountains of New York east of Hancock. Hawk Mountain is located northwest, Jehu Mountain is located northwest, Rattlesnake Hill is located south-southwest, Big Fork Mountain is located east-southeast, and Johnny Ridge is located south of Bittersweet Hill.

References

Mountains of Delaware County, New York
Mountains of New York (state)